Moravci v Slovenskih Goricah is a settlement in the Slovene Hills southwest of Ljutomer in northeastern Slovenia. The area traditionally belonged to the Styria region and is now included in the Mura Statistical Region.

Name
The name of the settlement was changed from Moravci to Moravci v Slovenskih goricah in 1955.

Cultural heritage
The local chapel is a late-19th-century Neo-Gothic building erected on the foundations of an older plague column.

References

External links
Moravci v Slovenskih Goricah on Geopedia

Populated places in the Municipality of Ljutomer